Single Assignment C (SA-C) (pronounced "sassy") is a member of the C programming language family designed to be directly and intuitively translatable into circuits, including FPGAs. To ease translation, SA-C does not include pointers and arithmetics thereon. To retain most of the expressiveness of C, SA-C instead features true n-dimensional arrays as first-class objects of the language.

See also 

 Mitrionics

References

External links 
 SA-C homepage
 Initial paper describing SA-C

Array programming languages
C programming language family